My Daughter Patricia (German: Meine Tochter Patricia) is a 1959 Austrian comedy film directed by Wolfgang Liebeneiner and starring Martin Held, Gerhard Riedmann and Gerlinde Locker.

The film's sets were designed by the art director Wolf Witzemann. It was shot at the Rosenhügel Studios in Vienna.

Synopsis
A pharmacist finds his life disrupted when he discovers that he has an eighteen year old daughter living in Switzerland.

Cast
 Martin Held as Heinz Roland, Apotheker
 Gerhard Riedmann as Der Lüthi, Provisor
 Gerlinde Locker as Patricia Roland
 Chariklia Baxevanos as Denise Bermont
 Marianne Schönauer as Celia Bermont
 Edith Elmay as Trudchen Pälmann
 Hans Thimig as Dr. Hartung
 Horst Beck as Redakteur Bluhme

References

Bibliography 
 Bock, Hans-Michael & Bergfelder, Tim. The Concise CineGraph. Encyclopedia of German Cinema. Berghahn Books, 2009.

External links 

1959 films
1959 comedy films
Austrian comedy films
1950s German-language films
Films directed by Wolfgang Liebeneiner
Films shot at Rosenhügel Studios